Erwin Josi (born 1 March 1955 in Adelboden) is a retired Swiss alpine skier who competed in the men's downhill at the 1980 Winter Olympics.

External links
 sports-reference.com
 

1955 births
Living people
Swiss male alpine skiers
Olympic alpine skiers of Switzerland
Alpine skiers at the 1980 Winter Olympics
Sportspeople from Bern
20th-century Swiss people